The Sulu boobook or Sulu hawk-owl (Ninox reyi) is a species of owl in the family Strigidae. It is endemic to the Sulu Archipelago in the Philippines. It was previously known as a subspecies of the Philippine hawk-owl, but was reclassified in 2012, as voice and other evidence suggested it was a distinct species. It is found in tropical moist lowland forest. It is threatened by habitat loss.

Description
EBird describes the bird as "A fairly small owl of forest on the Sulu Islands. Uniformly barred, with brown upperparts and head, orange-brown underparts, white speckling on the wing, a broken pale bar behind the shoulder, a pale belly, long whiskers around the face, and yellow eyes. Note the white throat patch. Probably the only owl in its range except for Mantanani scops owl, but Sulu boobook is rufous rather than gray and lacks the black line around the face. Voice includes strange clucking notes starting with a rapid series ending in three slower notes: 'kukukukukuku klok-klok-klok'."

Among the species complex, this owl is unique with its call of a series of clucks rather than the typical screeching of the other Philippine hawk-owls in the species complex. It is distinguished by the heavy barring on its head and belly, white throat-patch and facial disk. 

It is medium-sized at 20cm tall, along with the Mindoro boobook within Philippine hawk-owl species complex. This is in between the larger Camiguin boobook, Romblon boobook and Cebu boobook at 25cm and the smaller Luzon boobook and Mindanao boobook, which are 15 to 18cm tall.

Habitat and Conservation Status 
Its habitat is in tropical moist lowland primary and secondary forests up to 700 meters above sea level. It is also occasionally seen on forest edge, clearings and plantations. On Tawi-Tawi, the species is also found in mature mangroves and large trees in the vicinity of villages 

The IUCN Red List classifies this bird as vulnerable with population estimates of  1,000 to 2,499 mature individuals. This species' main threat is habitat loss with wholesale clearance of forest habitats as a result of legal and illegal logging, mining, conversion into farmlands or palm oil plantations and urbanization. Due to the rapid loss of habitat in the Sulu Archipelago, many of the birds endemic to the region like the Sulu hornbill, Tawitawi brown dove, blue-winged racket-tail and the Sulu pygmy woodpecker are threatened with extinction.

There is no species-specific conservation program at present.

References

 Kennedy, R.S., Gonzales P.C., Dickinson E.C., Miranda, Jr, H.C., Fisher T.H. (2000) A Guide to the Birds of the Philippines, Oxford University Press, Oxford.

Sulu boobook
Endemic birds of the Philippines
Fauna of Sulu
Fauna of Tawi-Tawi
Fauna of Basilan
Sulu Archipelago
Sulu boobook